Comitas clarae is an extinct species of sea snail, a marine gastropod mollusc in the family Pseudomelatomidae.

Description
Dimensions: length 17.5 mm; breadth 6 mm length of the aperture 9 mm.

(Original description) The shell is elongate, fusiform, and thin. The posterior part of the spire is ribbed, anteriorly the ribs become obsolete. The shoulder of body whorl is obtusely angulate. The entire external surface of the whorls is covered with small, closely-set spiral lirae. The aperture is broad. The broad sinus is situated near the suture.

This fossil must be mainly distinguished by the absence of any sculpture. The upper part of the spire is ribbed and in the
lower whorls, these ribs become obsolete. The periphery of the last whorl is obtusely angular and the whole shell is covered
spirally with close fine thread-like lirce. The aperture is broad and the sinus wide, deep, and conspicuous. A peculiarity in
this shell is that the lines of growth scarcely show at all.

Distribution
This extinct marine species was found in Middle Eocene strata  in Victoria, Australia.

References

External links

clarae
Gastropods described in 1880
Gastropods of Australia